Diamanto Manolakou (born 1 March 1959, in Piraeus) is a Greek politician. She was elected as a Member of the European Parliament (MEP) for the Communist Party of Greece in the 2004 European elections, an office she held until 5 June 2008, when she resigned in favor of Costas Droutsas. She sat with the European United Left–Nordic Green Left. She resigned in order to take a seat in the Hellenic Parliament, one previously held by Elpida Pantelaki. She was re-elected to the Hellenic Parliament in 2009, May and June 2012.

References

External links
 
 

1959 births
Living people
Politicians from Piraeus
Communist Party of Greece MEPs
European United Left–Nordic Green Left MEPs
MEPs for Greece 2004–2009
21st-century women MEPs for Greece
Greek MPs 2007–2009
Greek MPs 2009–2012
Greek MPs 2012 (May)
Greek MPs 2012–2014
Greek MPs 2015 (February–August)
Greek MPs 2015–2019
Greek MPs 2019–2023